Sob (also Sob, Usino) is a Rai Coast language spoken in Madang Province, Papua New Guinea by approximately 2,500 people.

The Sob language has been labelled under several different names. Among the names are Usino, Usina, Sopu, and Igoi. Usino is the name of one of the villages and the name used for the government station. The speakers of this language do not recognize the name Usino as a name for their language, but use the endonym Sob.

Phonology

Consonants

Where symbols appear in pairs the one to the left represents a voiceless consonant
t, and d represent dental/alveolar/post-alveolar consonants, while n is only alveolar

Vowels

Syllabification

The canonical syllable profile of Sob is (C)V(C). Thus, vowels are required to have a nuclear vowel, and may optionally have an onset and/or coda. The overwhelming majority of syllables have an onset in Sob, forming the unmarked CV shape. Complex onsets and complex codas are disallowed for markedness.

Personal pronouns

References

External links
Rosetta Project: Sop Swadesh list

Rai Coast languages
Languages of Madang Province